Paul-Martin Gallocher de Lagalisserie (29 May 1805, Place Dauphine, Paris – 5 August 1871, Balbins, Isère) was a French engineer. He was the son of Martin Pierre Gallocher de Lagalisserie and Marie Delphine Théodore Ménager.

Notable projects 
 Pont de l'Alma (1856)
 Pont des Invalides (1856)
 Pont Saint-Michel (1857)
 Pont au Change (1860)
 Pont de Solférino (1861)

Sources 
This page is a translation of its French equivalent.

1805 births
1871 deaths
French bridge engineers
Engineers from Paris